Dennis Scott (born 15 June 1976) is an Australian former professional rugby league footballer who played as a  and  forward in the 1990s and 2000s. 

He played for the Brisbane Broncos in the ARL Premiership, Super League and the NRL, and the Canterbury Bulldogs and the Melbourne Storm in the National Rugby League.

Background
Scott began playing junior rugby league for Moranbah Sharks before being graded by Brisbane.

Playing career
Scott made his first grade debut for Brisbane against Auckland in Round 22 1996.  Scott played with Brisbane up until the end of 1998 but did not play in the club's back to back premiership victories.

In 1999, Scott joined Canterbury-Bankstown and played more regularly over the next five seasons but was not selected to play in the club's 2004 premiership winning side.

In 2005, Scott joined Melbourne Storm and played one season with them before retiring due to lingering injuries during the 2006 season.

Post-playing career
After Scott retired from Rugby League, he did an apprenticeship in carpentry. This led him into the landscaping industry, with developing his company "Lush Landscape Solutions". In 2021, it was announced that he would be joining Foxtel's lifestyle television program Selling Houses Australia as the exterior and garden designer, when the program returns in the 2022 TV season, after a 2-year absence.

References
.

External links
Canterbury Bulldogs profile

1976 births
Living people
Australian rugby league players
Brisbane Broncos players
Canterbury-Bankstown Bulldogs players
Melbourne Storm players
Rugby league props
Rugby league second-rows
Rugby league locks
Rugby league players from Queensland